There are many skin conditions that may occur which are associated with cancers, as well as some benign tumors, inside the human body.

Footnotes

See also 
List of target antigens in pemphigus
 List of cutaneous conditions
 List of genes mutated in cutaneous conditions
 List of cutaneous conditions caused by mutations in keratins

References 

 
 

Internal malignancy
Dermatology-related lists